Brazitis Nunatak is a nunatak,  high, along the edge of an ice escarpment  south of DesRoches Nunataks in the southwestern Patuxent Range, Pensacola Mountains. It was mapped by the United States Geological Survey from surveys and from U.S. Navy air photos, 1956–66, and named by the Advisory Committee on Antarctic Names for Peter F. Brazitis, a cosmic ray scientist at South Pole Station, winter 1967.

References 

Nunataks of Queen Elizabeth Land